Michael Scott (born 3 June 1993) is a Scottish professional footballer, who played as a midfielder for Livingston in the Scottish First Division and now plays for Christos FC in the United States Adult Soccer Association.

Early life 
Scott grew up in Dalgety Bay and attended Inverkeithing High School, where he was depute head boy.

Career
Scott played for Dunfermline Athletic, Heart of Midlothian and East Fife as a youth player, before signing for Livingston. He has also represented Scotland as an Under 18 School Boy Internationalist.

Livingston
A member of Livingston's under 19 squad, Scott made his first team debut on 10 March 2012, playing from the start in a 3–1 victory over Greenock Morton in the Scottish First Division.

UMBC Retrievers
Scott began a soccer scholarship at UMBC in August 2012. In his first full season, Scott started 2 games but appeared in all 20 matches the team played, including 2 in the NCAA D1 National Tournament. He scored his lone goal of the season against Hartford at home on 24 October 2012. As a team, UMBC won the America East Conference on penalties vs. the University of New Hampshire.

In his second season Scott started 1 game at University of Massachusetts Lowell and played 90 minutes, scoring the game-winning goal in a 2–0 victory. He appeared in 15 games that season including the 2nd round NCAA tournament match that UMBC hosted against the University of Connecticut, where the Retrievers would fall on PKs. Again though, UMBC would win the America East Conference title as well as the Regular Season title. That year the squad's overall record was 16-1-3, earning the highest win percentage (.875) in the nation and an end of season rank of #14 by NSCAA.

In Scott's 3rd Season he would become more of a playing factor, starting 20 games out of a possible 25 but appearing in them all. He would add 2 goals and 3 assists on the season from his wide midfield position. UMBC again won the America East Conference and would appear in the NCAA D1 National Tournament again for a 3rd straight year, and would reach the 'College Cup' before being beaten by the University of Virginia, 1–0, the eventual National Champion in the semi-finals. Along the way the squad would set numerous tournament records by winning 4 games in a row all away from home and not conceding in any of the 4 games either, their run was hailed a 'Cinderella Story'. Scott would be awarded All-Conference honors on the America East All-Academic team. He would also receive the Coaches' Award at the end of season team banquet.

The 2015 season was Scott's senior campaign and he was named a Team Captain for the year. He would start in all 20 games the team played that year and added 4 goals and 6 assists on the season. His 6 assists would lead the team and 4 goals tie for second. UMBC would eventually fall in 2OT in the America East Conference semi-final to eventual conference champions Vermont. At the end of the season, Scott would be honored with America East All-Academic team for the second straight year and also to the All-Conference second team.

Ending his career at UMBC, Scott appeared in 80 games total, which is good to tie 3rd place on the all-time appearances at UMBC. He started in 38 of those appearances, scoring 8 goals and adding 8 assists.

Christos FC
Upon ending his career at UMBC, Scott would join local amateur team Christos FC In his first season with the team, Scott would become a double National Champion, winning the National Amateur Cup and the Amateur portion of the U.S. Open Cup. Along the way to winning these titles, he would also help the team to win State and Regional titles as well.

Career statistics

References

1993 births
Living people
People educated at Inverkeithing High School
Scottish footballers
Association football forwards
UMBC Retrievers men's soccer players
Dunfermline Athletic F.C. players
Heart of Midlothian F.C. players
East Fife F.C. players
Livingston F.C. players
Christos FC players
Scottish Football League players
Footballers from Fife
Scottish expatriate sportspeople in the United States
Expatriate soccer players in the United States
Scottish expatriate footballers